Rahman K. Johnson (born May 26, 1976, in Orange Park, Florida) is a local television & radio personality and former Group 5 At Large Representative for the Duval County Soil and Water Conservation District.

Politics
With his election to the Duval County Soil and Water Conservation District in 1999, Johnson became the youngest elected official in Florida at the time. There was some controversy surrounding an unapproved cellular phone, which was billed through the city. After much debate, it was eventually settled with Johnson agreeing to pay the $800 bill. In August 2000 Johnson was a delegate to the Democratic National Convention.  In January 2001 Ebony magazine named Johnson one of "30 Young [Black] Leaders under 30" nationally.  In 2002 Johnson campaigned first for the Jacksonville City Council, then for state representative, but was defeated in the September 2002 Democratic primary.

In 2018 Johnson was serving on a Jacksonville task force on the city's civil rights history.

Entertainment

Johnson has served as an on-air radio personality in Jacksonville for WJBT 92.7, WSOL V101.5, and WXQL 105.7. He also served as a host for several shows on the local cable station (Teen Cultural Perspective, The Video Zone). He appeared on an episode (#20) of the action/adventure series Sheena in 2001. In January 2003 he appeared in a regional theatre production of Miss Evers' Boys in Jacksonville. He was the host of SPLAT, a Nickelodeon show which aired in the summer and early fall of 2004.

Johnson is (as of late 2019) an assistant professor of communications at Edward Waters College in Jacksonville.

External links
Official Site
3 in the running for State Rep Seat
On the 'Splat!' track
Conservation issues fuel young politician
Rocky start for young politician
 Rahman on Sheena

References

1976 births
Living people
Politicians from Jacksonville, Florida
People from Orange Park, Florida